Matthew Young (born 25 October 1985 in Leeds, West Yorkshire) is a semi-professional football midfielder who plays for Evo-Stik Premier Division side Frickley Athletic. He began his career at Huddersfield Town in League One.

Career

Huddersfield Town 

Young progressed through the youth ranks at Huddersfield Town to make his debut in the 3–1 win over Walsall in October 2005. He made another two appearances this season, as the Terriers finished in a Play-Off spot. He made a bigger impact upon the first team in the following season, making twenty-nine appearances and scoring twice. His first goal for the club was the equalizing goal in Huddersfield's 1–1 draw against Chesterfield at the Galpharm Stadium on 27 January 2007.

His first away goal for the club was a scant consolation goal in the humiliating 5–1 defeat against Nottingham Forest at the City Ground on 3 March. The humiliating defeat was to be the end of manager Peter Jackson's second spell in charge of the Terriers.

The 2007–08 season did not bring much joy to Young. He missed most of the season due to injury and when Andy Ritchie tried to send him out on loan to either Chesterfield or Farsley Celtic, injury ruled him out again. He had a trial at Football League Two side Rotherham United in April 2008.

Later career 
Young spent the next two years at several clubs in West Yorkshire including Harrogate Town, Farsley Celtic, Guiseley and Ossett Town. He was part of Farsley's final squad before they filed for bankruptcy in the 2009/2010 season but ended the year on a high, winning promotion to the Conference North through the Play-Offs with Guiseley.

In October 2010, Young left Ossett Town and headed south to Nottinghamshire to sign for divisional rivals Worksop Town, managed by his former Huddersfield Town teammate Martin McIntosh. He made his debut for the Tigers after coming off the bench to replace Chris Bettney in a disappointing 1–1 draw away to Evo-Stik League Division One South side Market Drayton Town in the FA Trophy. Young scored on his league debut against Matlock Town.

In 2013 young returned for another stint at Farsley Celtic, before transferring to Frickley Athletic in 2014.

External links

Living people
1985 births
Footballers from Leeds
English footballers
Association football wingers
English Football League players
Northern Premier League players
Huddersfield Town A.F.C. players
Harrogate Town A.F.C. players
Farsley Celtic A.F.C. players
Guiseley A.F.C. players
Ossett Town F.C. players
Worksop Town F.C. players
Farsley Celtic F.C. players
Frickley Athletic F.C. players